Below is a list of newspapers published in Moldova.

Adevărul (Romanian)
Apropo Magazin (Romanian)
Asta Da! (Romanian)
Business Info (Romanian)
Capitala (Romanian)
Contrafort (Romanian)
Cuvântul (Romanian)
Cuvântul Liber (Romanian)
Democraţia (Romanian)
Dnestrovskaya Pravda (Russian) 
Eco (Romanian)
ECOnomist (Romanian)
Est Curier (Romanian)
Expresul de Ungheni (Romanian)
Flux (Romanian)
Gazeta de Vest (Romanian)
Glia Drochiană (Romanian)
Jurnal de Chişinău (Romanian)
Kommersant PLUS (Russian) 
Limba Română (Romanian)
Literatura şi Arta (Romanian)
Luminătorul (Romanian) 
Makler (Russian) 
Misionarul (Romanian) 
Moldova Azi (Romanian) 
Moldova Suverană (Romanian)
Molodezh Moldovy (Russian and Romanian) 
Observatorul de Nord (Romanian)
Ora Locală (Romanian)
Otdyhai s Futbolom (Russian)
Plai Sângerean (Romanian)
Relax with Football (Russian)
Săptămîna (Romanian)
Sport Plus (Romanian)
Sud-Est (Romanian magazine)
Sud Expres (Romanian)
Timpul (Romanian)
Trudovoi Tiraspol (Russian) 
Unghiul (Romanian)
Viaţa Basarabiei (Romanian)
Ziarul de Gardă (Romanian)
Fizica găurilor, teleportare si levitare (Russian)

Defunct 
Ardealul (Romanian)
Basarabia (Romanian)
Basarabia Reînnoită (Romanian)
Cuvânt moldovenesc (Romanian)
Cuvânt moldovenesc (Romanian magazine)
Deşteptarea (Romanian)
Făclia Ţării (Romanian)
Gazeta Românească (Romanian)
Glasul (Romanian)
Glasul Basarabiei (Romanian)
România Nouă (Romanian)
Russian Proriv! (Transnistrian newspaper) (Russian, 2007-2012)
Şcoala Moldovenească (Romanian)
Sfatul Țării (Romanian, 1917–20)
Sfatul Țării (Romanian)
Ţara (Romanian)
Viaţa Basarabiei, 1907 (Romanian)

References

External links
List of online newspapers from Moldova
List of Moldovan media
News aggregator of Moldovan media

Moldova
Newspapers